Staša Poznanović (born 21 October 1988) is a Croatian female badminton player.

Achievements

BWF International Challenge/Series
Women's doubles

Mixed doubles

 BWF International Challenge tournament
 BWF International Series tournament
 BWF Future Series tournament

References

External links
 

1988 births
Living people
Sportspeople from Zagreb
Croatian female badminton players
European Games competitors for Croatia
Badminton players at the 2015 European Games
21st-century Croatian women